Young Labour is the youth section of the UK Labour Party. Membership is automatic for Labour Party members aged 14 to 26.

It exists to involve young people in the Labour Party and ensure that the aspirations of young people are reflected in Labour's policies in power. Young Labour members are able to get involved in the Labour Party through local policy events, campaigning or by attending events and social gatherings.

Young Labour hosts an annual conference, alternating between national committee elections and policy conferences every other year. Young Labour also holds a range of additional national events, including fringe sessions at the annual Labour Party Conference.

Young Labour is affiliated to both the International Union of Socialist Youth (IUSY) and Young European Socialists (YES).

History
Throughout much of the 20th century, younger members of the Labour party were represented first by the Labour League of Youth and later by the Labour Party Young Socialists. These organisations often positioned themselves on the left of the party and frequently had a difficult relationship with its leadership. The latter of these groups went into decline in the late 1980s after reforms were made to make it more manageable and closed down entirely in 1991.

Young Labour was founded in 1993 by a Labour Party annual conference motion in Brighton, proposed by Tom Watson, seconded by Brian Whitington, then Chair of the Labour Party Young Socialists, and supported by then National Executive Committee Youth Representative Claire Ward.

In October 2017, Young Labour passed a motion at their annual conference which called for Britain to withdraw from NATO.

In May 2018, the organisation started a digital campaign against then-Labour MP Chuka Umunna after it was revealed that he employed university students to be unpaid interns. The campaign, "#PayUpChuka', led to the Labour leadership briefing the Parliamentary Labour Party that employing unpaid interns runs contrary to Labour's 2017 general election manifesto.

In October 2018, Young Labour voted to make Brazilian labour leader Luiz Inácio Lula da Silva its honorary president.

On 25 February 2022, Labour Party leader Keir Starmer scrapped Young Labour's annual conference in response to activists from the youth section criticising his backing for NATO during the Russian invasion of Ukraine. The tweets from earlier in February condemned Starmer for his "celebrating" of closer cooperation with NATO while he was also "attacking Stop the War and other pro-peace activists." Some of the statements from Young Labour were cited as follows:

It was also announced that Young Labour's funding would be cut in response to the comments, whilst its Twitter account was restricted by the party for what was described as breaches of acceptable "standards of behaviour". The move was condemned as bullying by Young Labour's elected chair Jessica Barnard, who also said it may drive young people away from Labour. An article from The Canary dubbed the move "Keir Starmer's latest authoritarian crackdown." The Labour party's shadow foreign secretary David Lammy described Young Labour's views as "lazy knee-jerk" anti-Americanism and said that "They don't speak on behalf the party."

Membership
Members of the Labour Party aged 14 to 26 are automatically members of Young Labour.

Structure

Young Labour National Committee 
The Young Labour National Committee acts as the executive of the organisation. It includes a chair, the National Executive Committee (NEC) youth rep, an international officer, an under-18s representative, four liberation officers, ten trade union reps, three Labour Students reps, 1 socialist society rep and 11 national and regional reps. In addition, the Labour Party appoints a permanent secretary to act as facilitator, National Policy Forum youth reps appoint a vice chair (policy).

Chair of Young Labour 
Between 1991 and 2009 the Chair of Young Labour was appointed by the Labour Party. Reforms passed by the Labour Party's annual conference saw the creation of a democratically elected chair, voted for by delegates at Young Labour's national conference, to serve a two-year term. The first election took place in 2009. In late 2017 the Labour Party's NEC changed the system so that the Chair of Young Labour is elected by a one-member-one-vote ballot of young members. It was reported that over 7,000 young members voted in the 2018 election.

Elected chairs of Young Labour
 2009–2011: Sam Tarry
 2011–13: Susan Nash
 2013–16: Simon Darvill
 2016–18: Caroline Hill
 2018–2020: Miriam Mirwitch
 2020-2022: Jessica Barnard
 Since 2022: Nabeela Mowlana

National Executive Committee Youth Rep 
Delegates at Young Labour's national conference also elected the Youth Rep to sit on the Labour Party's NEC. The election operated under an electoral college, with a third of the vote for young member delegates, a third for Labour Students delegates, and a third for delegates from affiliated trade unions and socialist societies.

For the 2018 election, the system was changed, with half of the vote allocated to young members through a one-member-one-vote ballot and half allocated to block votes by affiliated trade unions and socialist societies.

 1991–1995: Claire Ward
 1995–1997: Catherine Taylor
 1997–1999, Sarah Ward
 1999–2001: Claire McCarthy
 2001–2003: Blair McDougall
 2003–2005: Jonathan Reynolds
 2007–2011: Stephanie Peacock
 2011–2013: Callum Munro
 2013–2016: Bex Bailey
 2016–2018: Jasmin Beckett
 2018-2022: Lara McNeill
 Since 2022: Elsie Greenwood

Current Committee

Local groups
Young Labour groups exist at the local, regional, national, and international level, supporting the activity of the wider Labour Party and feeding in to Young Labour through its national committee.

The national groups are:

 Scottish Young Labour
 Welsh Young Labour
 Young Labour NI
 Young Labour International
 Young Labour Under-19s

See also
 Young Conservatives, the young wing of the Conservative Party
 Young Liberals, the youth wing of the Liberal Democrats

References

External links

Labour Party (UK)
Organisation of the Labour Party (UK)
Labour
Youth wings of social democratic parties